Hyperia is a genus of amphipods in the family Hyperiidae. It contains the following species:

Hyperia bowmani M. Vinogradov, 1976
Hyperia crassa  Bowman, 1973
Hyperia curticephala  M. Vinogradov & Semenova, 1985
Hyperia fabrei H. Milne Edwards, 1830
Hyperia galba Montagu, 1815
Hyperia gaudichaudii  H. Milne Edwards, 1840
Hyperia leptura  Bowman, 1973
Hyperia macrocephala Dana, 1853
Hyperia medusarum Müller, 1776
Hyperia spinigera  Bovallius, 1889

References

Hyperiidea
Taxa named by Anselme Gaëtan Desmarest
Malacostraca genera